Keith Orlando Herron (born June 14, 1956) is an American former basketball player. He was born in Memphis, Tennessee.

As a 6'7" forward out of Mackin High School in Washington, D.C., he played collegiately at Villanova University.  At the end of his college basketball career, he was Villanova's all-time leading scorer for 19 years, a mark that has since been surpassed by Kerry Kittles.  Herron was named to Basketball Weekly's All-East team, The Sporting News All-America team, the All-NIT team, and twice to the All-Big Five team.  Herron's brothers Larry and Reggie also played for the Villanova Wildcats.

Herron was drafted by the Portland Trail Blazers in the second round of the 1978 NBA Draft.  Herron played for the Atlanta Hawks in 1978–79, Detroit Pistons in 1980–81, and Cleveland Cavaliers in 1981–82.

Herron's nephew Justin Herron is an offensive tackle for the New England Patriots.

References

External links

1956 births
Living people
African-American basketball players
American men's basketball players
Atlanta Hawks players
Basketball players from Memphis, Tennessee
Cleveland Cavaliers players
Detroit Pistons players
Portland Trail Blazers draft picks
Shooting guards
Small forwards
Villanova Wildcats men's basketball players
21st-century African-American people
20th-century African-American sportspeople